Marie-Louise Dräger (born 11 April 1981) is a German national representative rower who has represented over a twenty-year period from 1999 to 2019. She is a five-time world champion lightweight sculler who has won world championships titles in all sculling boat classes. She is a three-time Olympian who competed for Germany in both the lightweight double sculls and the women's single sculls at the Olympics.

References

External links

1981 births
Living people
German female rowers
Sportspeople from Lübeck
Olympic rowers of Germany
Rowers at the 2008 Summer Olympics
Rowers at the 2012 Summer Olympics
Rowers at the 2016 Summer Olympics
World Rowing Championships medalists for Germany
21st-century German women
20th-century German women